Lobell is a surname. Notable people with the surname include:

Daniel Lobell, American stand-up comedian
David Lobell, American agricultural ecologist and professor
Mike Lobell, American film producer
Mimi Lobell (1942-2001) American architect, professor, cultural historian, and second-wave feminist
Johann Wilhelm Löbell (1786-1863), German historian

English-language surnames